N-6 adenine-specific DNA methyltransferase 1 is a protein that in humans is encoded by the N6AMT1 gene.

Function

The N6AMT1 gene encodes an N(6)-adenine-specific DNA methyltransferase. The encoded enzyme may be involved in the methylation of release factor I during translation termination. This enzyme is also involved in converting the arsenic metabolite monomethylarsonous acid to the less toxic dimethylarsonic acid. Alternative splicing of this gene results in multiple transcript variants. A related pseudogene has been identified on chromosome 11. [provided by RefSeq, Jul 2014]. N6AMT1 functions as a protein glutamine methyltransferase and is essential for mouse development (Liu et al., Mol. Cell. Biol. 2010).

References

Further reading 

Peng Liu,Song Nie, Bing Li,Zhong-Qiang Yang, Zhi-Mei Xu, Jian Fei, Chyuansheng Lin,
Rong Zeng, and Guo-Liang Xu. Deficiency in a Glutamine-Specific Methyltransferase for Release
Factor Causes Mouse Embryonic Lethality. MOLECULAR AND CELLULAR BIOLOGY, Sept. 2010, p. 4245–4253 Vol. 30, No. 17
0270-7306/10/